Patu Togi II Ativalu Vaimasanu’u Tunupopo (7 September 1941 — 6 November 2019) was a Samoan politician and Member of the Legislative Assembly of Samoa.  He was a member of the Samoan Democratic United Party and Human Rights Protection Party.

Patu was born in Vaiala. He worked for the Samoa Ports Authority, as a teacher, and then as a police officer, eventually rising to the rank of Chief Superintendent. He was a member of Samoa's rugby team at the 1963 South Pacific Games in Suva, Fiji.

Ativalu was first elected to Parliament as a member of the Samoan Democratic United Party in the 2001 election, but he lost his seat at the 2006 election He initially filed an election petition against the victorious candidate, Anauli Pofitu Fesili, then dropped it.

Following the death of Sililoto Tolo Tuaifaiva he contested and won the 2007 Vaimauga West by-election as a candidate for the Human Rights Protection Party. After the by-election, he was accused of bribery and treating, as well as accepting a US$25,000 bribe for withdrawing an election petition against the winner in the 2006 election, Anauli Pofitu Fesili.  However, no election petition was filed.

He lost his seat at the 2011 Samoan general election.

References

1941 births
2019 deaths
People from Tuamasaga
Samoan rugby union players
Members of the Legislative Assembly of Samoa
Human Rights Protection Party politicians
Samoan Democratic United Party politicians